Brittany Margaret Ratcliffe (born February 7, 1994) is an American soccer player who plays as a forward for North Carolina Courage of the National Women's Soccer League (NWSL).

Early life
Raised in the Williamstown section of Monroe Township, Gloucester County, New Jersey, Ratcliffe played soccer at Paul VI High School.

University of Virginia, 2012–2015
Ratcliffe played for the University of Virginia.  She appeared in 93 matches throughout her career there.

Club career

Boston Breakers, 2016
Ratcliffe was drafted by Boston Breakers in the 2nd round of the 2016 NWSL College Draft. She signed with Boston in April 2016 and made 15 appearances and 5 starts that season.  Boston later waived Ratcliffe in February 2017.

FC Kansas City, 2017
Ratcliffe spent the 2017 preseason with the Chicago Red Stars, after she didn't make their final roster she signed with FC Kansas City on April 14.

Utah Royals FC, 2018–2020
After FC Kansas City ceased operations following the 2017 season, Ratcliffe was officially added to the roster of the Utah Royals FC on February 8, 2018. On June 16, Ratcliffe scored a goal in second half stoppage time to give Utah a 1–0 win over the league leading North Carolina Courage, her goal was voted Goal of the Week.

References

External links
Virginia bio
 

1994 births
Living people
American women's soccer players
Virginia Cavaliers women's soccer players
Boston Breakers players
National Women's Soccer League players
People from Monroe Township, Gloucester County, New Jersey
Soccer players from New Jersey
Sportspeople from Gloucester County, New Jersey
Boston Breakers draft picks
FC Kansas City players
Utah Royals FC players
Women's association football forwards
Kansas City Current players
North Carolina Courage players